The 1986 Canadian Professional Championship was a professional non-ranking snooker tournament, which took place between 28 July and 3 August 1986 at Snooker Centre, Toronto, Canada.

Cliff Thorburn won the title for the third year in a row, and fourth overall, by beating Jim Wych 6–2 in the final. Wych compiled the highest break of the tournament, 129, in his quarter-final match against Bernie Mikkelsen.

The World Professional Billiards and Snooker Association funded £13,000 in prize money through its national championship subsidy, a scheme which provided £1,000 per entrant. Thorburn received £2,900 as winner.

Main draw

References

Canadian Professional Championship
1986 in snooker
1986 in Canadian sports